Hermann Becker-Freyseng (18 July 1910 – 27 August 1961) was a German physician and consultant for aviation medicine with the Luftwaffe during the Nazi era. He was recognised as a leading specialist in aviation medicine. Becker-Freyseng was one of those convicted at the Doctors' Trial.

Early research
Becker-Freyseng graduated as a physician from the University of Berlin in 1935 although his first notable research involvement did not come along until three years later when he worked with Hans-Georg Clamman on experiments on the effects of pure oxygen.

Work with the Nazis
Becker-Freyseng was initially recruited by Hubertus Strughold to take part in the Nazi human experimentation programme that he oversaw. Becker-Freyseng's particular area of experimentation was low-pressure-chamber research, in which he worked alongside Ulrich Luft, Otto Gauer and Erich Opitz. The Department for Aviation Medicine was established in 1936 with Becker-Freyseng initially just attached before he was promoted to co-ordinator. Unlike some of his colleagues in military medical research, he was a member of the Nazi Party. He also held the rank of captain in the Medical Service.

The various experiments undertaken either by Becker-Freyseng or under his supervision during the course of his work resulted in a number of fatalities. In particular, the high altitude experiments performed on inmates of Dachau concentration camp by Becker-Freyseng, Siegfried Ruff and Hans-Wolfgang Romberg claimed a number of lives. One of the most well-known was that detailed in a paper published by him and Konrad Schäfer entitled "Thirst and Thirst Quenching in Emergency Situations at Sea". For the experiments, the academics had personally asked Heinrich Himmler for 40 healthy camp inmates who were then forced to drink salt water or in some cases had it injected into their veins. Half the subjects were then given a drug called berkatit whilst all were subjected to an invasive liver biopsy without anaesthetic. All subjects died, including those given the berkatit, which proved toxic.

Trial and work with the USA
Indicted at the Doctors' Trial, he was found guilty of charges 2 and 3 (war crimes and crimes against humanity). He was sentenced to twenty years' imprisonment. However, in 1946, Becker-Freyseng's name was amongst a list of twenty drawn up by Harry George Armstrong who were to be brought to the United States to assist in the development of American space medicine. Along with Kurt Blome, Siegfried Ruff and Konrad Schäfer, he was taken to the US and put to work on projects related to the space race. Given responsibility for collecting and publishing the research undertaken by him and his colleagues, the resulting book, German Aviation Medicine: World War II, appeared just after Becker-Freyseng began his prison sentence. In 1951, Becker-Freyseng's sentence was commuted to 10 years, and he was released from prison in 1952.

Becker-Freyseng was diagnosed with multiple sclerosis in 1960 and died from the condition the following year.

References

1910 births
1961 deaths
People from Ludwigshafen
People from the Palatinate (region)
Physicians in the Nazi Party
Physicians from North Rhine-Westphalia
Humboldt University of Berlin alumni
People convicted by the United States Nuremberg Military Tribunals
German people convicted of crimes against humanity
Neurological disease deaths in Germany
Deaths from multiple sclerosis
German people convicted of war crimes